Our Fellow Americans is a Canadian documentary television miniseries which aired on CBC Television in 1976.

Premise
This eight-episode series featured interviews with various people in the United States in recognition of that nation's bicentennial. Host Larry Solway interviewed such Americans as writer Ray Bradbury, Luckenbach, Texas personality "Hondo" Crouch, billionaire Nelson Bunker Hunt, Georgia governor Lester Maddox and Chicago author-broadcaster Studs Terkel. Each episode dwelled on a particular region of the United States such as California, Florida, the Mississippi River, New England, New York and Texas.

Scheduling
This half-hour series was broadcast on Thursdays at 9:00 p.m. (Eastern) from 27 May to 5 August 1976.

References

External links
 

CBC Television original programming
1976 Canadian television series debuts
1976 Canadian television series endings